Devin Clark may refer to:
 Devin Clark (fighter) (born 1990), American mixed martial artist
 Devin Clark (American football) (born 1986), American football offensive tackle